Thomas von Westen (13 September 1682 – 9 April 1727) was a Norwegian Lutheran priest and missionary. He was a driving force in the Sami mission, and founded the education institution Seminarium Scholasticum, the later Seminarium Lapponicum, in Trondheim.

Personal life
Von Westen was born in Trondheim in Sør-Trøndelag, Norway. He was the son of Arnoldus von Westen (1643–1698) and his second wife, Inger Marie Thomasdatter Meyer. His father was a pharmacist at Løveapoteket Apothecary. His grandfather had been mayor of Trondheim.

Career
Von Westen attended Trondheim Cathedral School and was educated for the priesthood at the University of Copenhagen where he took his Artium Baccalaureus degree in 1698. He received his  Cand.theol. in 1699. After completing his education, he started working as a priest in Helgeland. In 1709, he was appointed vicar of Veøy in Romsdal.

Along with his friend and fellow priest Nils Engelhart, von Westen was an active participant of an association of priests which they named Syvstjernen.  Established in 1713, Syvstjernen was an association of the seven priests in Romsdal. The group met regularly to establish mutual support and to advance the principals  of Pietism.

He was also a pioneer of Christian mission among Sami people in Norway. He undertook three trips to northern Norway between 1716 and 1723. He also educated Sami boys to become teachers. During 1717, he founded a school at his home in Trondheim which he called "Seminarium domesticum". The school closed after Westen died in 1727; however, it served as a model for the later Seminarium Lapponicum which operated between 1752–1774.

See also 
 College of Missions
Nærøy manuscript

References

Other sources
Sæter, Ivar (1926) Thomas von Westen (1926) Finnefolket sande ven, Læreren og videnskapsmanden (Oslo: Gyldendal) 
Grankvist, Rolf (2003) Seminarium Lapponicum Fredericianum i Trondheims-miljoet (Trondheim: DKNVS) 

1682 births
1727 deaths
Clergy from Trondheim
People educated at the Trondheim Cathedral School
University of Copenhagen alumni
18th-century Norwegian Lutheran clergy
Norwegian Lutheran missionaries
People in Sámi history
People from Sør-Trøndelag
Lutheran missionaries in Europe
Protestant missionaries in Norway